Øystein Elgarøy (13 June 1929 – 8 September 1998) was a Norwegian astronomer, with a specialty in solar radio astronomy.

Career
He was appointed as a lecturer of astrophysics at the University of Oslo, located in Oslo, Norway, in 1968, and was a professor from 1983. Elgarøy published several books, including textbooks.

Personal life
He was a brother of composer Jan Elgarøy. He was a strong apologist for Christianity until he became an atheist. 

His son, also named Øystein Elgarøy  (born 1972), is  a professor of astrophysics at the University of Oslo.

References

1929 births
1998 deaths
People from Moss, Norway
20th-century astronomers
20th-century Norwegian people
Norwegian astronomers
Academic staff of the University of Oslo